The IT History Society (ITHS) is an organization that supports the history and scholarship of information technology by encouraging, fostering, and facilitating archival and historical research. Formerly known as the Charles Babbage Foundation, it advises historians, promotes collaboration among academic organizations and museums, and assists IT corporations in preparing and archiving their histories for future studies.

Activities
The IT History Society provides background information to those with an interest in the history of Information Technology, including papers that provide advice on how to perform historical work and how historical activities can benefit private sector organizations. It tracks historical projects seeking funding as well as projects underway and completed. It maintains online, publicly available, lists of events pertaining to IT history, IT history resources, an IT Honor Roll acknowledging more than 700 individuals who have made a noteworthy contribution to the information technology industry, and a database of notable technology quotes.

A continuing project is one of aggregating the locations and content of IT history archival information around the world to facilitate and encourage IT history research and scholarship. This International Database of Historical and Archival Sites currently consists of 1,663 international information technology historical and archival collections encompassing over 49.8 million documents. An IT Hardware database has been added consisting of 12,187 entries, an IT Honor Roll with 1,031 entries, and a  Technical Quotes database with over 1,000 entries. These databases are being added to on a regular basis an IT Software and IT Companies databases will debut soon. ITHS holds an annual meeting and conference.

History
The International Charles Babbage Society was founded in 1978 and operated out of Palo Alto, California. The following year the American Federation of Information Processing Societies (AFIPS) became a principal sponsor of the society, which was renamed the Charles Babbage Institute. In 1980, the institute moved to the University of Minnesota, which contracted with the principals of the Charles Babbage Institute to sponsor and house the institute. A new entity, the Charles Babbage Foundation, was created to help support and govern the institute, in partnership with the university. In 1989, CBI became an organized research unit of the university.

Around 2000, CBF broadened its mission to support the history of information technology through other organizations, collaborating, for example, with the Sloan Foundation, Software History Center, and the Computer History Museum in experimenting with Internet-based archival and historical research.  In 2002, the Charles Babbage Foundation broadened its mission to support the entire IT history community.  In 2007, CBF changed its name to the IT History Society and reworked its programs to better support the IT history community.

Charles Babbage Institute
The Charles Babbage Institute is a research center at the University of Minnesota specializing in the history of information technology, particularly the history of digital computing, programming/software, and computer networking since 1935. The institute is named for Charles Babbage, the nineteenth-century English inventor of the programmable computer. The institute is located in Elmer L. Andersen Library at the University of Minnesota Libraries in Minneapolis, Minnesota.

Babbage Activities
In addition to holding important historical archives, in paper and electronic form, its staff of historians and archivists conduct and publish historical and archival research that promotes the study of the history of information technology internationally. CBI also encourages research in the area and related topics (such as archival methods); to do this, it offers graduate fellowships and travel grants, organizes conferences and workshops, and participates in public programming. It also serves as an international clearinghouse of resources for the history of information technology.

Also valuable for researchers are its extensive collection of oral history interviews, more than 400 in total.  Oral histories with important early figures in the field have been conducted by CBI staff and collaborating colleagues.  Owing to the poorly documented state of many early computer developments, these oral histories are immensely valuable documents.  One author called the set of CBI oral histories "a priceless resource for any historian of computing."  Most of CBI's oral histories are transcribed and available online.

The archival collection also contains manuscripts; records of professional associations; corporate records (including the Burroughs corporate records and the Control Data corporate records, among many others); trade publications; periodicals; manuals and product literature for older systems, photographic material (stills and moving), and a variety of other rare reference materials.

It is now a center at the University of Minnesota, and is located on its Twin Cities, Minneapolis campus, where it is housed in the Elmer L. Andersen Library on the West Bank.

Archival papers and oral histories
The CBI has collections of archival papers and oral histories from many notable figures in computing including:

  Gene Amdahl
  Walter L. Anderson
  Isaac L. Auerbach
  Rebecca Bace
  Charles W. Bachman
  Paul Baran
  Jean Bartik
  Edmund Berkeley
  James Bidzos
  Gertrude Blanch
  Vint Cerf
  John Day
  Edsger W. Dijkstra
  Wallace John Eckert
  Alexandra Illmer Forsythe
  Margaret R. Fox
  Gideon Gartner
  Bruce Gilchrist
  George Glaser
  Martin A. Goetz
  Gene H. Golub
  Carl Hammer
  Martin Hellman
  Frances E. Holberton
  Cuthbert Hurd
  Anita K. Jones
  Brian Kahin
  Donald Knuth
  Bryan S. Kocher
  Mark P. McCahill
  Daniel D. McCracken
  Alex McKenzie
  Carl Machover
  Michael Mahoney
  Marvin Minsky
  Calvin N. Mooers
  William C. Norris
  Susan Nycum
  Donn B. Parker
  Alan J. Perlis 
  Robert M. Price
  Claire K. Schultz
  Erwin Tomash 
  Keith Uncapher
  Willis Ware
  Terry Winograd
  Patrick Winston
  Konrad Zuse

CBI History
CBI was founded in 1978 by Erwin Tomash and associates as the International Charles Babbage Society, and initially operated in Palo Alto, California.

In 1979, the American Federation of Information Processing Societies (AFIPS) became a principal sponsor of the Society, which was renamed the Charles Babbage Institute.

In 1980, the institute moved to the University of Minnesota, which contracted with the principals of the Charles Babbage Institute to sponsor and house the institute.  In 1989, CBI became an organized research unit of the university.

See also

 History of computing
 History of computing hardware
 History of operating systems
 History of the internet
 Internet governance
 List of pioneers in computer science
 Standards Setting Organization

References

External links
 
 CBI website
 History of CBI and CBF

Charles Babbage
1978 establishments in Minnesota
Historical societies of the United States
History of science organizations
History of computing
Information technology organizations
International organizations based in the United States
Oral history
Organizations established in 2007
Organizations based in Minnesota
Research institutes established in 1978
University of Minnesota